Kaputt might refer to:

 Kaputt (album) (2011), by Destroyer
 Kaputt (band), British band
  (1944), by Curzio Malaparte

See also
 Alles Kaputt, Junkers Ju 290 A-4 no. 0165 (FE 3400), Nazi aircraft captured by the Allies in World War II